Alex Lora: 35 Años y lo Que le Falta Todavía (Alex Lora: 35 Years and What Is Left to Come) is the twenty-second album and fifth live album by Mexican rock and blues band El Tri. It was released in 2004.

This was the last album by the band to be released by WEA before the front man of the band Alex Lora funded his own Record label named Lora Records.

Track listing 
All tracks by Alex Lora except where noted.

Disc one 
 "Intro/De la Raza Pa' la Banda" (From the People to the Band) – 11:06 (No Te Olvides de la Banda, 2002)
 "Ya No le Metas" (Give the Thing a Rest) – 3:17 (Lora, Su Lira y Sus Rolas, 1999)
 "Chilango Incomprendido" (Misunderstood Chilango) – 4:09 (25 Años, 1993)
 "Las Mujeres de Juárez" (The Women of Juarez) (Lora, Rafael Salgado) – 6:18
 "El as No Conocido" (The Unknown Ace) (Lora Sergio Mancera) – 2:44 (21 Años Después, Alex Lora y El Tri, 1989)
 "Seria Horrible" (It Would Be Horrible) – 2:55
 "Tu Sonrisa" (Your Smile) – 4:39 (No Te Olvides de la Banda, 2002)
 "Tren del Infierno" (Hell's Train) – 4:58 (21 Años Después, Alex Lora y El Tri, 1989)
 "Quién da un Peso Por Mis Sueños" (Who Gives a Dime for My Dreams) (Armando Manzanero) – 3:19 (Fin de Siglo, 1998)
 "Solamente Dios" (Only God) – 5:50 (No Te Olvides de la Banda, 2002)
 "Pamela" (Lora, Oscar Zarate) – 5:51 (Hoyos en la Bolsa, 1996)
 "Es lo Mejor" (It's the Best) – 4:15 (Es lo Mejor, 1974)
 "El Rey" (The King) – 5:25 (25 Años, 1993)
 "Las Víctimas Invisibles de Nueva York" (The Invisible Victims of New York) (Lora, Chela Lora) – 3:48
 "Todo Me Sale Mal" (Everything I Do Comes Out Wrong) – 4:48 (Fin de Siglo, 1998)

Disc two 
 "Ahi Pa' la Otra"(Next Time)  – 6:06
 "Esclavo del Rocanrol" (Slave of Rock 'n Roll) (Rodrigo Levario, Lora) – 3:30 (Cuando Tú No Estás, 1997)
 "El Mamey y el Nero" (Lora, Horacio Reni) – 4:25 (Lora, Su Lira y Sus Rolas, 1999)
 "San Juanico '84" (Lora, Mancera) – 6:50 (Simplemente, 1984)
 "Juanita" (Lora, Mancera, Mariano Soto) – 4:55 (Simplemente, 1984)
 "Pobres de los Niños" (Poor Kids) – 5:17 (Bellas de Noche, 1979)
 "La Raza Más Chida" (Lora, Pedro Martinez) (The Coolest Race) – 5:57 (Una Rola Para los Minusvalidos, 1994)
 "Triste Canción" (Sad Song) – 10:29 (Simplemente, 1984)
 "Virgen Morena" (Brown-Skinned Virgin) – (Cuando Tú No Estás, 1997)
 "Todo Es Materia" (Everything Is Matter) – 4:57 (Una Rola Para los Minusvalidos, 1994)
 "Las Piedras Rodantes" (The Rolling Stones) – 10:41 (Una Rola Para los Minusvalidos, 1994)

Album and year of original release inside parenthesis

Personnel 
 Alex Lora – guitar, bass, vocals, producer, mixing
 Rafael Salgado – harmonic
 Eduardo Chico – guitar
 Oscar Zarate – guitar
 Chela Lora – backing vocals
 Ramon Perez – drums

Guest musicians 
 Lalo Toral – keyboards, Pipe organ in "Virgen Morena".
 Zbigniew Paleta – violin in "Triste Canción"
 Sergio Mancera "El Cóndor" – guitar in "San Juanico ('84)", "Juanita", and "Pobres de los niños".
 Mariano Soto – drums in "San Juanico ('84)", "Juanita", "Pobres de los niños" and "Triste Canción".
 Arturo Labastida "El Papaito" – sax in "San Juanico", "Juanita", "Pobre de los niños", and "Triste Canción".
 "La Tribu" ethnic group – "Intro/De la Raza pa' la banda" and "La Raza Más Chida".
 "Las Piedras Rodantes" string group in "Solamente Dios" and "Pamela".
 "Zanate y Asociados" coral group in "Virgen Morena" and "Todo es Materia".
 Armando Manzanero – vocals in "Quien Da un Peso Por Mis Sueños".
 Johnny Laboriel – vocals in "Seria Horrible".
 Kenny Avilés – vocals in "El Rey".
 Rod Levario – guitar in "Esclavo del Rocanrol".
 Horacio Reni – vocals, guitar, harmonic in "El Mamey y El Ñero".

Technical 
Fernando Aceves – photography
Angel Aguirre – artwork
David Bojorges – editing
Craig Brock – engineer
Marco Cataño – A&R
Joaquin Perez Fernandez – A&R
Eduardo Gomez – engineer
Fernando Roldán – mastering Engineer
Jean B. Smith – engineer

External links 
Alex Lora: 35 Años y lo Que le Falta Todavía at MusicBrainz
Alex Lora: 35 Años y lo Que le Falta Todavía at MusicBrainz (Disc 2)
[ Alex Lora: 35 Años y lo Que le Falta Todavía] at AllMusic

El Tri live albums
2004 live albums
Warner Music Group live albums
Spanish-language live albums